Gorka Elustondo Urkola (born 18 March 1987) is a Spanish professional footballer who plays as a central defender or a defensive midfielder.

He spent most of his career with Real Sociedad after making his debut in 2006, going on to appear in 167 competitive matches over six La Liga seasons (nine in total, eight goals).

Club career

Real Sociedad
Elustondo was born in Beasain, Gipuzkoa. A product of Real Sociedad's prolific youth ranks, he made his La Liga debut on 20 December 2006 in a 0–0 away draw against RC Celta de Vigo. He made a further five first-team appearances in his first professional season, as the Basque club suffered top-tier relegation for the first time in 40 years.

In late October 2008, with Real in the second division, in a home derby against Deportivo Alavés, Elustondo suffered a serious knee injury (which later relapsed), being rendered unavailable for the remainder of the campaign. He contributed 30 matches – 26 starts – and one goal in 2009–10, helping the Txuriurdin return to the Spanish top flight after three years, as champions.

Athletic Bilbao
On 1 July 2015, after his contract with Real Sociedad expired, Elustondo signed a two-year deal with their neighbours, Athletic Bilbao. He made his competitive debut on 30 July, playing the second half of a 0–0 draw at Inter Baku PIK in the third qualifying round of the UEFA Europa League. His first league appearance occurred on 23 August, where he committed a penalty on Luis Suárez – later missed by Lionel Messi – in an eventual 0–1 home loss to FC Barcelona. Four days later, in the Europa League playoff round against MŠK Žilina, he scored through a long-range effort in the 23rd minute for the game's only goal and an away goals rule qualification.

On 2 June 2017, Elustondo confirmed that he would leave the San Mamés Stadium at the end of his contract.

Rayo Vallecano
On 17 January 2018, after a brief spell in Colombia with Atlético Nacional, the 30-year-old Elustondo returned to Spain after agreeing to an 18-month deal with Rayo Vallecano.

International career
Elustondo was part of the Spain under-19 squad that won the 2006 UEFA European Championship, in Poland.

Honours

Club
Real Sociedad
Segunda División: 2009–10

Athletic Bilbao
Supercopa de España: 2015

Rayo Vallecano
Segunda División: 2017–18

International
Spain U19
UEFA European Under-19 Championship: 2006

References

External links

1987 births
Living people
People from Beasain
Spanish footballers
Footballers from the Basque Country (autonomous community)
Association football defenders
Association football midfielders
Association football utility players
La Liga players
Segunda División players
Segunda División B players
Real Sociedad B footballers
Real Sociedad footballers
Athletic Bilbao footballers
Rayo Vallecano players
Categoría Primera A players
Atlético Nacional footballers
Spain youth international footballers
Basque Country international footballers
Spanish expatriate footballers
Expatriate footballers in Colombia
Sportspeople from Gipuzkoa